Erica Marie Sullivan (born August 9, 2000) is an American swimmer. She received a silver medal in the 1500-meter freestyle at the 2020 Summer Olympics after placing second and qualifying in the event at the 2020 US Olympic Swimming Trials.

Personal
Sullivan's father, John, a former swimmer for the University of Wisconsin, died of esophageal cancer when she was 16. In the aftermath, she dealt with mental health issues. “I'm proud of the mental health barriers that I got through, with my dad dying in 2017 and really hitting a rock bottom in 2018 from the stress of losing a parent at age 16 and having to get over the anxiety, the panic attacks, the depression, the PTSD, all that,” she said during the Olympic Trials in Omaha.

Sullivan is lesbian and is currently dating Austin-based activist Izzy Richards. Sullivan's mother, Maco, is Japanese.

Sullivan has a YouTube channel she started on August 4, 2014, and where she has published swimming related content. Her first video, publicly published on December 14, 2014, was a vlog covering her team, the Sandpipers of Nevada, at the Junior National Swimming Championships in December 2014.

Since 2020, Sullivan has produced an annual Twitter thread comparing swimming to films nominated for Academy Awards for the year.

Career

2018 Pan Pacific Championships
In August 2018, she represented the United States at the Pan Pacific Swimming Championships in Tokyo, Japan. She placed 5th in the timed-finals of the 800-meter freestyle swimming a time of 8:26.27, 9th in the timed-finals of the 1500-meter freestyle with a time of 16:16.07, and 14th in the heats of the 400-meter freestyle with a time of 4:14.68.

2020 Summer Olympics

Sullivan qualified to compete at the 2020 Summer Olympics in the 1500-meter freestyle for the USA Olympic swimming team. At the 2020 Olympic Games in Tokyo, Japan, she won the silver medal in the 1500-meter freestyle with a time of 15:41.41, just 4.07 seconds behind gold medalist Katie Ledecky, on July 28, 2021 at the Tokyo Aquatics Center. Sarah Köhler of Germany took the bronze medal with a time of 15:42.91. It was the first occurrence of women competing in the 1500-meter freestyle at the Summer Olympic Games.

2022 NCAA Championships 

Sullivan competed for the University of Texas at the 2022 NCAA DI Swimming and Diving Championships. She took third place in the Women's 500 yard freestyle in a 4:35.92 and second place in the Women's 1650 yard freestyle in a 15:45.94.

Awards and honors
 Golden Goggle Award nominee, Perseverance Award:  2021

References

External links
 
 

2000 births
Living people
American female freestyle swimmers
Swimmers at the 2020 Summer Olympics
LGBT swimmers
Lesbian sportswomen
American sportspeople of Japanese descent
Medalists at the 2020 Summer Olympics
Olympic silver medalists for the United States in swimming
21st-century American women
American LGBT sportspeople